Percy Sydney Dawson (1865–1916) was a founding partner of one of the legal firms that became Blake Dawson (now Ashurst Australia) and the first City Solicitor of the City of Sydney.

Early life
Dawson was born in Cooma, New South Wales, and educated at Newington College (1881–1883) and the University of Sydney. He was the eighth son of Robert Dawson, who was for over 40 years the police magistrate in Cooma.

Legal career
In 1886 Dawson was articled to solicitor George Charles King Waldron, and upon admission as a solicitor in 1891 the firm became known as Waldron & Dawson.

City Solicitor
On 9 February 1899, Dawson was appointed as the first City Solicitor for the City of Sydney.

Death
Dawson died at home in the Sydney suburb of Wahroonga and was at the time the senior partner of the legal firm then known as Dawson, Waldron, and Glover, of Pitt Street. He was survived by a widow and four children, and his papers are held by the State Library of New South Wales.

References

1865 births
1916 deaths
People educated at Newington College
Sydney Law School alumni
Lawyers from Sydney
19th-century Australian lawyers
20th-century Australian lawyers